Fluorescent Black may refer to:

Fluorescent Black (comics), 2008–2010 story in Heavy Metal magazine
Fluorescent Black (album), 2009 album by American hip hop group Anti-Pop Consortium